Tarnished Lady is a 1931 American pre-Code drama film directed by George Cukor and starring Tallulah Bankhead and Clive Brook. The screenplay by Donald Ogden Stewart is based on his short story, A Story of a New York Lady.

Plot

Nancy Courtney, a once wealthy socialite, has had to struggle to maintain a facade of prosperity ever since her father's death. Although she loves writer DeWitt Taylor, who is indifferent to amassing a fortune, her mother urges her to marry stockbroker Norman Cravath instead. Nancy acquiesces to her mother's wishes but, despite the fact her new husband does everything he can to please her, she is miserable in her marriage.

Meanwhile, DeWitt has begun romancing Norman's former girl friend Germaine Prentiss, Nancy's long-time rival. She realizes DeWitt's relationship with Germaine is changing him into a social climber. Unaware Norman's firm has just been barred from the stock market and he is facing financial ruin, Nancy tells her husband she is leaving him. She learns of Norman's bankruptcy in the newspaper and, together with her friend Ben Sterner, she goes to a speakeasy where she proceeds to get drunk. She and Ben bring some of the bar patrons to his home, where they encounter Norman, who is waiting there to discuss a business transaction with Ben. Seeing his wife in such a disreputable state, he tells her he never wants to see her again.

Nancy tries to live on her own but, lacking any skills, she is unable to find employment and becomes destitute. When she discovers she is pregnant, Ben offers her a place to live and, after the birth of her child, he hires her to work in his department store. Norman and Germaine come in to purchase a fur coat, and Norman is stunned to find Nancy in a menial position. Germaine tries to warn Nancy away, but realizing her husband still loves her, Nancy asks him for another chance. Germaine bows out and leaves Norman with his forgiven wife and infant son.

Cast
Tallulah Bankhead as Nancy Courtney 
Clive Brook as Norman Cravath 
Phoebe Foster as Germaine Prentiss 
Alexander Kirkland as DeWitt Taylor
Osgood Perkins as Ben Sterner  
Elizabeth Patterson as Mrs. Courtney
Beatrice Ames as Minor Role (uncredited)
Eric Blore as Jewelry Counter Clerk (uncredited)
Berton Churchill as Stock Speculator (uncredited)
Edward Gargan as Al, a Man in Bar (uncredited)
Dewey Robinson as Tony the Waiter (uncredited)
Cora Witherspoon as Saleslady (uncredited)

Critical reception
Mordaunt Hall of The New York Times observed, "Miss Bankhead acquits herself with considerable distinction, but the vehicle to which she lends her talent is no masterpiece. In fact, only in a few spots is the author's fine hand discernible."

Variety called it a "weepy and ragged melodrama [that] has little outside its cast to be recommended . . . Cast, as a whole, deports in a manner suggesting they were under orders to give way before Bankhead. Clive Brook suffers the most. Ordinarily a fine actor, he slumps here in trying to get over some of the silly dialog."

References

External links

Stills at Tallulah Bankhead website

 

1931 films
American drama films
1931 drama films
Films set in the 1930s
American black-and-white films
Films directed by George Cukor
Paramount Pictures films
Films produced by Walter Wanger
Films with screenplays by Donald Ogden Stewart
1930s English-language films
1930s American films
Films scored by Vernon Duke